Asutsure is a town in the Greater Accra Region of Ghana. The town is known for the Osudoku Secondary/Technical School.  The school is a second cycle institution.
Economic activity> Rice farming.
Key companies> Golden Exotics Limited (banana and poultry)，Shinefeel Ghana Limited (tissue papers and plastics), China Fujian Finishing Ghana Limited (tilapia and fish feed), Lan-T Limited (Soy milk Beverages), Richland Agricultural Machines (Agricultural Equipment Service Providers), Agrokings Limited(Vegetables and Rice), TOP Sat(Agricultural Equipment Service Providers) and TOP Farms (Rice, Pepper, Cassava, Dairy Milk, Meat & Soybeans).

References

Populated places in the Central Region (Ghana)